Louisville High School (LHS) is a public secondary school in Louisville, Mississippi, United States. It hosts grades 9–12. Its mascot is the wildcat.

Alumni 
 Doug Cunningham - Professional football player
 Larry Estes - Professional football player
 Andy Kennedy (basketball) - basketball player and coach

References

External links 

Public high schools in Mississippi
Education in Winston County, Mississippi